A referendum on becoming an autonomous overseas territory was held in French Guiana on 10 January 2010. The proposal was rejected by 70% of voters who prefer full integration in the French central state. The turnout was 48%. A simultaneous referendum was rejected in Martinique.

Background
French President Nicolas Sarkozy proposed the referendum after visiting the Caribbean island of Martinique in June 2009. The French overseas departments of Martinique and Guadeloupe had suffered prolonged general strikes in early 2009, due to lower wages and standards of living than mainland France.

French Guianan voters were asked whether they wanted more power to be given to the local government based in Cayenne. French Guiana was an overseas region and an overseas department of France, regulated by the article 73 of the French Constitution, giving it the same political status as metropolitan departments and regions. The proposed change would have led to it becoming an overseas collectivity, regulated by the article 74 of the French Constitution, similar to French Polynesia.

Results

References

External links
RFI: Martinique and Guyana vote on more autonomy

Referendums in French Guiana
2010 in French Guiana
2010 referendums
January 2010 events in South America
Autonomy referendums